Throscinus is a genus of minute marsh-loving beetles in the family Limnichidae. There are about eight described species in Throscinus.

Species
These eight species belong to the genus Throscinus:
 Throscinus aethiops Darlington, 1936
 Throscinus crotchi LeConte, 1874
 Throscinus politus Casey, 1889
 Throscinus punctatus Wooldridge, 1981
 Throscinus schwarzi Schaeffer, 1904
 Throscinus schwarzii Schaeffer, 1904
 Throscinus simplex Wooldridge, 1981
 Throscinus spangleri Wooldridge, 1981

References

Further reading

 

Byrrhoidea
Articles created by Qbugbot